This is a list of singles that charted in the top ten of the Billboard Hot 100, an all-genre singles chart, in 2016.

Five songs which charted in the top ten during 2016 spent at least 20 total weeks in that region of the chart: Drake's "One Dance" (featuring Wizkid and Kyla); Justin Bieber's "Sorry" and "Love Yourself"; and The Chainsmokers' "Don't Let Me Down" (featuring Daya) and "Closer" (featuring Halsey). Since "Closer" spent 32 weeks in the top ten it was tied with "How Do I Live" by LeAnn Rimes for the most weeks in the top ten since the chart's inception in 1958. This record was broken in September 2017 when Ed Sheeran's "Shape Of You" got 33 weeks in the top 10. Both Bieber and Drake are tied with the most top-ten hits during the year, with five. Selena Gomez, Twenty One Pilots, The Chainsmokers and Rihanna follow them with three.

Top-ten singles
Key
 – indicates single's top 10 entry was also its Hot 100 debut
 – indicates Best performing song of the year
(#) – 2016 year-end top 10 single position and rank

Notes
 – α "When Doves Cry" and "Purple Rain" both originally charted in 1984, with the former spending five weeks at #1, beginning on July 7, 1984, and the latter reaching #2 on November 17 that year. "Doves" originally accumulated 11 weeks in the top 10, while "Purple" was in the tier for seven weeks. See List of Billboard Hot 100 top 10 singles in 1984 for more. The above entries for the two singles reflect their runs in 2016 only.

2015 peaks

2017 peaks

Notes 
The single re-entered the top ten on the week ending February 27, 2016.
The single re-entered the top ten on the week ending April 9, 2016.
The single re-entered the top ten on the week ending April 30, 2016.
The single re-entered the top ten on the week ending May 14, 2016.
The single re-entered the top ten on the week ending May 21, 2016.
The single re-entered the top ten on the week ending June 11, 2016.
The single re-entered the top ten on the week ending June 18, 2016.
The single re-entered the top ten on the week ending September 3, 2016.
The single re-entered the top ten on the week ending September 17, 2016.
The single re-entered the top ten on the week ending September 24, 2016.
The single re-entered the top ten on the week ending October 1, 2016.
The single re-entered the top ten on the week ending October 8, 2016.
The single re-entered the top ten on the week ending November 12, 2016.
The single re-entered the top ten on the week ending November 26, 2016.

See also
 2016 in American music
 List of Billboard Hot 100 number ones of 2016
 Billboard Year-End Hot 100 singles of 2016

References

External links
Billboard.com
Billboard.biz
The Billboard Hot 100

United States Hot 100 Top Ten Singles
2016